Clergerie is a surname. Notable people with the surname include: 

Pierre Clergerie, French rower
Robert Clergerie, French shoe designer 

Surnames of French origin